W. Brady Hetrick (February 3, 1907 – August 5, 1999) was a Democratic member of the Pennsylvania House of Representatives.

References

Democratic Party members of the Pennsylvania House of Representatives
1907 births
1999 deaths
20th-century American politicians